Dioptis fatima is a moth of the family Notodontidae first described by Heinrich Benno Möschler in 1877. It is found in Brazil, Venezuela, Guyana, Suriname, French Guiana and Peru.

References

Moths described in 1877
Notodontidae of South America